Özkul may refer to:

 Aytaç Özkul (born 1989), Turkish basketball player
 Çağıl Özge Özkul (born 1988), Turkish beauty pageant winner
 Münir Özkul (born 1925), Turkish cinema and theatre actor
 Yetkin Özkul (born 1986), Turkish kickboxer

Turkish-language surnames